In computing, regsvr32 (Register Server) is a command-line utility in Microsoft Windows  and ReactOS for registering and unregistering DLLs and ActiveX controls in the operating system Registry. Despite the suffix "32" in the name of the file, there are both 32-bit and 64-bit versions of this utility (with identical names, but in different directories). regsvr32 requires elevated privileges.

To be used with regsvr32, a DLL must export the functions DllRegisterServer and DllUnregisterServer.

The regsvr32 command is comparable to ldconfig in Linux.

Example usage
regsvr32 shmedia.dll for registering a file

regsvr32 shmedia.dll /s  for registering a file without the dialog box ( silent )

regsvr32 /u shmedia.dll for unregistering a file

regsvr32 shmedia.dll /u /s  for unregistering a file without the dialog box ( silent )

If another copy of shmedia.dll exists in the system search path, regsvr32 may choose that copy instead of the one in the current directory.  This problem can usually be solved by specifying a full path (e.g., c:\windows\system32\shmedia.dll) or using the following syntax:

regsvr32 .\shmedia.dll

References

Further reading

External links

Microsoft TechNet Regsvr32 article
Explanation of Regsvr32 Usage and Error Messages
C# Frequently Asked Questions: What is the equivalent to regsvr32 in .NET?
A free graphical user interface for regsvr32.exe

Windows administration
Windows commands